"Envious" is the debut solo single by R&B singer-songwriter Dawn Robinson. (All Robinson’s previous singles had been recorded and released during her membership in En Vogue and Lucy Pearl.) The song was written Robinson, Kowan "Q" Paul, Milton Davis, and Amber Jade Young, produced by Kowan Paul. The song was composed for Robinson's debut solo album, Dawn. Atlantic Records released "Envious" on November 20, 2001, as the album's lead single.

Music video

The music video opens with Dawn in a dark area with a small crowd of people around her she sings the first verse to them. As the chorus starts the lights come on and it shows thousands of people around Dawn. The people stand and join hands to make a tunnel which Dawn crawls through as she sings the second verse. She is then seen wearing a red dress and crawling up a huge wall of men, she then spray paints a heart on one of the men's chest. Dawn then falls from the wall and is caught by the crowd below and her clothes suddenly change to a black jacket, T-shirt and leather trousers. Dawn and the crowd then dance until the song fades out.

Charts

References

External links
 Dawn Robinson - Envious (Music video) on DailyMotion

2002 debut singles
2002 songs
Songs written by Milton Davis
Songs written by Dawn Robinson